The Georgia Tech Center for Music Technology (GTCMT) is an interdisciplinary research center housed at Georgia Institute of Technology College of Design. The Center, founded in November 2008, by Gil Weinberg focuses on research and development of new musical technologies for music creation, performance and consumption. GTCMT's mission is to provide a collaborative framework for committed students, faculty, and researchers to apply their musical, technological, and scientific creativity to the development of innovative artistic and technological artifacts.

Research 
Research in the center focuses on innovative musical technologies that transform the way in which music is created, performed and consumed. Research groups include Robotic Musicianship, Distributed, Music Informatics, Mobile Music and Sonification.

Musical Initiatives 
GTCMT is home for a number of artistic and musical initiatives:
 The Margaret Guthman Musical Instrument Competition - an annual event focusing on identifying the world’s best new ideas in musical instrument design, engineering, and performance.
 Sonic Generator - a contemporary music ensemble-in-residence dedicated to the performance and exploration of music composed, shaped, influenced, enhanced, and created by the use of technology.
 Listening Machines - An annual student concert series.

References

External links

Georgia Tech